This is a list of films produced in South Korea in 1948. For films released prior to August 1948, see List of Korean films.

References

External links

 1945-1959 at koreanfilm.org

South Korea
1948
Films